El Clásico Moderno (The Modern Classic) also referred by some as the Clasico Moderno Hondureño is a Honduran football match played at least 4 times a year in the Honduran Liga Nacional and consists of two teams, Olimpia and Real España.  The Clásico Moderno is the most fierce derby played in Honduras.  The two "Barras" (MegaBarra and Commando 12 from España and Ultra Fiel from Olimpia) confront themselves with deadly results almost every time they meet.  It is considered the most aggressive, violent and the strongest rivalry in Honduran soccer.  During the 1970s, 1980s, and early 1990s it was considered without doubt the greatest derby of the Honduran football, during these 25 years both team won a total of 16 championships (9 Olimpia and 7 Real España), 3 during the 1970s for both teams, 4 for Olimpia and 2 for Real España during the 1980s, and 2 for both during the early 1990s.  During the late half of this decade, time during which Olimpia has won 2 Championships and Real España 1, the rivalry has recover some of its luster.  Both teams are the only "Tricampeones" Three-consecutive championship victories, Real España won 3 complete season championships and Olimpia 3 half season championships.

Head to head

Regular season

Post season

Totals

 Olimpia has scored 292 goals against Real España:
 154 at Estadio Tiburcio Carías Andino
 95 at Estadio General Francisco Morazán
 32 at Estadio Olímpico Metropolitano
 8 at Estadio Carlos Miranda
 1 at Estadio Excélsior
 Real España has scored 208 goals against Olimpia:
 105 at Estadio General Francisco Morazán
 76 at Estadio Tiburcio Carías Andino
 21 at Estadio Olímpico Metropolitano
 4 at Estadio Carlos Miranda
 2 at Estadio Excélsior

Goalscorers
As of 6 December 2020: Wilmer Velásquez scored 17 goals against Real España and Carlos Pavón scored 9 goals against Olimpia.

Rock Throwing
In two occasions España's MegaBarra have been involved with throwing rocks to two players from the Olimpia side.  Due to the barbaric actions of the MegaBarra, sanctions were taken against Real España and security is tighter for these matches.

The two players who were struck by rocks were Elmer Marín (who would later player with Real España himself) and Gerson Vásquez.

References

External
 Olimpia
 Real España

Association football rivalries in Honduras